DFA Records is an American independent record label founded in 2001 by Mo' Wax co-founder Tim Goldsworthy, musician James Murphy, and manager Jonathan Galkin. They previously had a production team called The DFA, consisting of Goldsworthy and Murphy.

History

James Murphy and Tim Goldsworthy met while working in New York on the David Holmes album Let's Get Killed.  After the recording was completed, Goldsworthy stayed in New York, and the two began to throw parties in the Lower East Side.  They created the production duo, The DFA, but wished to grow The DFA into more than what it was. It was not until they met Jonathan Galkin, who subsequently quit his event-production job to work with James and Tim, that they turned DFA into a label.

DFA Records began on a series of 12" single vinyl releases starting with The Rapture's "House of Jealous Lovers" and The Juan Maclean's "By the Time I Get to Venus".  "House of Jealous Lovers" went on to sell 7500 copies. Many of the early releases of DFA's catalog were released in Europe through Trevor Jackson's Output Recordings. After completing production on The Rapture's debut full-length album Echoes, DFA began to shop around the album.  Although The Rapture eventually signed to Universal Music Group, the DFA label secured a deal with EMI for distribution of its acts outside the United States, along with several distributors within the U.S.

The label has grown steadily since, producing full-length albums for its ever-growing roster of artists, as well as releasing a selection of singles and compilations on their label.  Notable releases include The Rapture's EP "House of Jealous Lovers", the twice-Grammy nominated debut of James Murphy's band LCD Soundsystem and its follow-ups Sound of Silver, This Is Happening and American Dream. DFA have also released a number of compilation albums featuring artists such as The Rapture, The Juan Maclean, Black Dice, Shit Robot, Delia Gonzalez & Gavin Russom, J.O.Y., Pixeltan, Black Leotard Front, Hot Chip, and LCD Soundsystem.

As a production team, the DFA have produced and remixed artists including Radio 4, Le Tigre, N.E.R.D., Soulwax, Blues Explosion, Nine Inch Nails, Automato, Gorillaz, UNKLE, The Chemical Brothers and M.I.A. The DFA remix of M.I.A.'s "Paper Planes" appeared on A. R. Rahman's Academy Award-winning Slumdog Millionaire soundtrack. They spent an afternoon writing a song with Britney Spears, and were also approached by Janet Jackson to collaborate. The production duo effectively came to an end when Tim Goldsworthy left New York and moved back to his native UK.  The label was primarily run by Jonathan Galkin and Kris Petersen.

Death From Abroad
In 2007 DFA Records started an imprint label titled Death From Abroad.  This offshoot is used to release 12" singles by artists not based in North America, such as Mock & Toof and ALTZ.  The imprint also released a CD compilation of tracks released on the Berlin based Supersoul Recordings.

Name dispute
The label's original name was Death From Above Records, dating from Murphy's nickname for the sound system he had helped build for Six Finger Satellite. This name was deemed inappropriate for a New York City-based label following the September 11, 2001 attacks and subsequently shortened to its abbreviation DFA.

In 2004, DFA Records forced the Canadian duo Death From Above to change their name to Death from Above 1979. Murphy explained his side of the story in a 2005 interview with Pitchfork Media:

We knew about them for a long time, the name thing wasn't a big deal. It wasn't until they signed to a major label, which wouldn't release the record until we signed off on the name. That's how this all came about.... [Parent company of Death From Above 1979's label, Vice] Atlantic's not gonna release a record by a band with the same name as another entity in music.... We spent a lot of money because we didn't just wanna be total fucking assholes and just say no. We were trying to find a way for it to actually work.... I was like, "What the hell's wrong with Death From Above 1979?" But the copyright attorney was like, "No, that's not fine." And I said, "If they become a totally different name, and it delays their record, that's something I'm not comfortable with." So we just tried to make it work as well as possible.

The band would later go on to change their name to Death from Above in 2017 without any legal repercussions.

Dispute over finances
In 2013 Murphy filed a lawsuit against Goldsworthy, alleging he owed money and had been making unauthorised withdrawals from bank accounts and using the company credit card improperly.

Additionally, in 2020, Galkin was dismissed by Murphy due to concerns regarding finances and maintaining artist relationships. The split was acrimonious and involved legal disputes regarding the removal of Galkin's minority ownership of DFA.

Sound and influence
As well as Murphy's LCD Soundsystem the label is currently home to the likes of The Juan Maclean, Hot Chip (North America only), Shit Robot, Gavin Russom, Prinzhorn Dance School, Shocking Pinks, Holy Ghost!, Still Going, Syclops, Planningtorock and Yacht.  They are also jointly releasing music with fellow New York City based label Rong Music, by artists such as Free Blood and Woolfy.  The label has also reissued the first two albums by Athens, Georgia based new wave band Pylon, the first time they have been available on CD, as well as a retrospective collection of tracks by Peter Gordon and the Love of Life Orchestra.

The influence of musicians and bands like Brian Eno, Talking Heads, Liquid Liquid, ESG, Blondie, Yazoo, New Order, as well as Chicago House, can be heard throughout the DFA catalog. Rather than retread, however, the DFA have taken the live dance music of the time and infused the techniques and themes with a modern aesthetic—alternately faster, heavier, dubbier, noisier, and generally more intense than their influences.

Artists
Artists who have released music on DFA Records include:

Benoit & Sergio
Black Dice
Black Meteoric Star
The Clouds
The Crystal Ark
Dan Bodan
Delia Gonzalez & Gavin Russom
Essaie pas
Factory Floor
Free Energy
Guerilla Toss
Hercules and Love Affair
Holy Ghost!
Hot Chip
Joe Goddard
The Juan Maclean
Larry Gus
LCD Soundsystem
Liquid Liquid
Marcus Marr
Marie Davidson
Mock & Toof
Museum of Love
Nils Bech
Panthers
Peter Gordon and the Love of Life Orchestra
Pixeltan
Planningtorock
Prinzhorn Dance School
Pylon
The Rapture
Rayna Russom
Shit Robot
Shocking Pinks
Sinkane
The 2 Bears
Yacht
Yura Yura Teikoku

Discography

Label

Compilations
DFA Compilation, Vol. 1 (DFA · 2003)
DFA Compilation, Vol. 2 (DFA · 2004)
DFA Holiday Mix 2005 (DFA · 2005)
The DFA Remixes – Chapter One (DFA · 2006)
The DFA Remixes – Chapter Two (DFA · 2006)
Nobody Knows Anything (Death From Abroad · 2008)
Songs to Burn and Sing (DFA · 2012)

Production
The following outlines production credits to The DFA (Murphy and Goldsworthy), and is not a list of recordings released by DFA Records.

A New Machine for Living by Turing Machine (Jade Tree · 2000)
AM Gold by Zero Zero (Jade Tree · 2001)
Out of the Races and Onto the Tracks EP by The Rapture (Sub Pop · 2001)
Gotham by Radio 4 (City Slang · 2002)
Automato by Automato (co-produced by Phil Mossman) (Coup de Grace · 2003)
Echoes by The Rapture (DFA · 2003)
"El Monte"/"Rise" (single) by Delia Gonzalez & Gavin Russom (DFA · 2003)
"Get Up/Say What" (single) by Pixeltan (DFA · 2004)
"Kousho" and "Ibasho" by We Acediasts, on Pre Acediasts EP (Mesh-Key · 2004)
"Casual Friday" (single) by Black Leotard Front (DFA · 2005)
LCD Soundsystem by LCD Soundsystem (DFA · 2005)
Less Than Human by The Juan MacLean (DFA · 2005)
The Days of Mars LP by Delia Gonzalez & Gavin Russom (DFA · 2005)
"Wrong Galaxy"/"Triumph" (single) by Shit Robot (DFA · 2006)
Sound of Silver by LCD Soundsystem (DFA · 2007)
Prinzhorn Dance School by Prinzhorn Dance School (DFA · 2007)
"Chasm"/"Lonely Planet" (single) by Shit Robot (DFA · 2007)
"Hold On" (single) by Holy Ghost! (DFA · 2007)
"Happy House" (single) by The Juan MacLean (DFA · 2008)
"The Simple Life" (single) by The Juan MacLean (DFA · 2008)
The Future Will Come by The Juan MacLean (DFA · 2009)
"Stuck On Nothing" by Free Energy (DFA · 2009)
"Simple Things (Work it out)" by Shit Robot (DFA · 2009)
From the Cradle to the Rave by Shit Robot (co-produced by Marcus Lambkin) (DFA · 2010)

Remixes

"Deceptacon" (DFA remix) for Le Tigre, on Remix (Mr. Lady · 2001)
"Orange Alert" (DFA remix) for Metro Area, on "Dance Reaction" (Source · 2002)
"Dance to the Underground" (The DFA version) for Radio 4, on "Dance to the Underground" (City Slang · 2002)
"Emerge" (DFA version) for Fischerspooner, on "Emerge" (Capitol · 2002)
"Destination: Overdrive" (DFA remix) for Chromeo, on "Destination: Overdrive" (Turbo · 2003)
"Rise" (DFA remix) for Delia Gonzalez & Gavin Russom, on "El Monte"/"Rise" (DFA · 2003)
"In a State" (DFA remix) for UNKLE, on "In a State" (Mo' Wax · 2003)
"Shake Your Coconuts" (DFA mix) and (DFA Instrumental mix) for Junior Senior, on "Shake Your Coconuts" (Atlantic · 2003)
"Sister Saviour" (DFA remix) and (DFA remix instrumental), and "Echoes" (DFA remix) for The Rapture, on "Sister Saviour" (Output · 2003)
"Sunplus" (DFA remix) for J.O.Y., on DFA Compilation #2 (DFA · 2004)
"Get Up/Say What" (DFA remix) for Pixeltan, on "Get Up/Say What" (single) (DFA · 2004)
"She Wants to Move" (DFA remix) for N.E.R.D., on "She Wants to Move" (Virgin · 2004)
"Mars, Arizona" (DFA remix) for Blues Explosion, on "Crunchy" EP (Mute · 2005)
"Dare" (DFA remix) for Gorillaz, on "Dare" (Parlophone · 2005)
"Another Excuse" (DFA remix) for Soulwax, on "NY Excuse" (PIAS · 2005)
"The Hand That Feeds" (DFA remix) for Nine Inch Nails, on "The Hand That Feeds" (DFA remixes) and "Only" (Interscope · 2005)
"Just Like We (Breakdown)" (DFA remix) for Hot Chip, on "Over & Over"/"Just Like We (Breakdown)" (Astralwerks · 2005)
"Smiling Off" (DFA remix) for Black Dice, on "Smiling Off" (DFA · 2005)
"The Boxer" (DFA Version) for The Chemical Brothers, on "The Boxer" (Virgin · 2005)
"(Far From) Home" (DFA remix) for Tiga, on "(Far From) Home" (PIAS · 2006)
"Colours" (DFA remix) for Hot Chip, on "Colours" (EMI · 2006)
"Slide In" (DFA remix) for Goldfrapp, on "Fly Me Away" (Mute · 2006)
"Relevee" (DFA remix) for Delia Gonzalez & Gavin Russom, on "Revelee" (DFA · 2006)
"Springfield" (DFA Remix) for Arthur Russell, on "Springfield" (Audika · 2006)
"My Love" (DFA Remix) for Justin Timberlake, on "My Love" (Zomba · 2006)
"Frontline" (DFA Remix) for Captain, on "Frontline" (EMI · 2006)
"Paper Planes" (DFA Remix) for M.I.A. on Paper Planes (Homeland Security Remixes) - EP (XL Records - 2008)
"Tomorrow" (DFA Remix) for Clinic on "Tomorrow" (Domino Recording Company - 2008)
"Love Is Lost" (Hello Steve Reich Mix By James Murphy For The DFA) for David Bowie on The Next Day Extra (Columbia Records - 2013)

See also
List of record labels
List of electronic music record labels

References

External links
Official site for DFA
Official Death From Abroad website
DFA Records at Discogs.com
The DFA at Discogs.com

Electronic music record labels
American independent record labels
Record labels established in 2001
2001 establishments in New York City
Companies based in New York City